The taifa of Zaragoza was an independent Arab Muslim state in the east of Al-Andalus (present day Spain), which was established in 1018 as one of the taifa kingdoms, with its capital in Saraqusta (Zaragoza) city. Zaragoza's taifa emerged in the 11th century following the destruction of the Caliphate of Córdoba in the Moorish controlled Iberian Peninsula.

During the first two decades of this period (1018–1038), the city was ruled by the Arab Banu Tujib tribe. They were replaced by the Arab Banu Hud rulers, who had to deal with a complicated alliance with El Cid of Valencia and his Castilian masters against the Almoravids, who managed to bring the Taifas Emirates under their control. After the death of El Cid, his kingdom was conquered by the Almoravids, and by 1100 they had crossed the Ebro into Barbastro, which brought them into direct confrontation with Aragon.

The Banu Hud stubbornly resisted the Almoravid dynasty and ruled until they were eventually defeated by the Almoravids in May 1110. The last sultan of the Banu Hud, Abd-al-Malik, and Imad ad-Dawla of Saraqusta, were forced to abandon the capital. Abd-al-Malik allied himself with the Christian Aragonese under Alfonso I of Aragon and from then on the Muslim soldiers of Saraqusta served in the Aragonese forces. Soon afterwards (1118) a good deal of the old taifa, including the city of Zaragoza, was conquered by the Christian kingdom of Aragon, and remained in Christian hands thereafter.

Between c. 1040 and c. 1105, the Taifa of Lérida was separate from that of Zaragoza.

List of Emirs

This list is taken from The Routledge Handbook of Muslim Iberia,
edited by Maribel Fierro.

Tujibid dynasty
Al-Mundhir ibn Yahya al-Tujibi: c. 1013–1021/2
Yahya ibn al-Mundhir: 1021/2–1036
Al-Mundhir ibn Yahya: 1036–1038/9
Abd Allah ibn al-Hakam al-Tujibi: 1038/9

Huddid dynasty
Al-Musta'in I: 1038/9–1046
Muhammad al-Hayib Adud ad-Dawla (Calatayud): 1046/7–1066/7 with...
Lubb (Huesca): 1047–1048 and...
Mundir al-Hayib al-Zafir Nasir ad-Dawla (Tudela): 1047–1048/9 and...
Yusuf al-Muzaffar Sayf ad-Dawla (Lérida): 1047–1078/81 and...
Ahmad al-Muqtadir: 1046–1081/3
Yusuf al-Mu'taman ibn Hud: 1081/3–1085
Al-Musta'in II: 1085–1110
'Abd al-Malik Imad ad-Dawla: 1110

Almoravid dynasty 
 Muhammad ibn al-Hajj: 1110–1115
 ibn Tifalwit: 1115–1117
 Conquered by Alfonso the Battler, King of Navarre and Aragon, in 1118

See also
 History of Islam
 History of Spain
 List of Sunni Muslim dynasties

References

 
History of Zaragoza
11th-century establishments in Al-Andalus
States and territories established in 1013
1013 establishments in Europe
States and territories disestablished in 1110
1110 disestablishments in Europe
Upper March
12th-century disestablishments in Al-Andalus